Theodore Amar Lyons (December 28, 1900 – July 25, 1986) was an American professional baseball starting pitcher, manager and coach in Major League Baseball (MLB). He played in 21 MLB seasons, all with the Chicago White Sox. He is the franchise leader in wins.

Lyons was inducted into the Baseball Hall of Fame in 1955. He has the fourth-highest career ERA among Hall of Fame pitchers, and is the only Hall of Fame pitcher to have more walks than strikeouts. In 1981 Lawrence Ritter and Donald Honig included Lyons in their book The 100 Greatest Baseball Players of All Time.

Career

Playing career

Lyons broke into the major leagues in  after playing collegiate baseball at Baylor University. He joined the White Sox on a road trip and never pitched a day in the minors. Lyons recorded his first two wins as a relief pitcher in a doubleheader on October 6, 1923, making him one of the first pitchers to perform the feat. He worked his way into the starting rotation the following year, when he posted a 12–11 record and 4.87 ERA.

On August 21, Lyons no-hit the Boston Red Sox 6–0 at Fenway Park; the game took just 1 hour and 45 minutes to complete (Ted Lyons August 21, 1926 No-hitter Box Score).

On May 24, 1929, Lyons threw a 21 inning complete game in a 6-5 loss to the Detroit Tigers. George Uhle, who was the winning pitcher, also pitched twenty innings to earn his eighth win of the season. The pair became the tenth pair of pitchers in baseball history to throw at least 20 innings in a game and only the 4th since the live-ball era began in 1920.

Lyons was at his crafty best in 1930, when he posted a 22–15 record and A.L.-leading totals of 29 complete games and  innings for a team that finished 62–92. Prior to a 1931 arm injury, his pitches included a "sailer" (now known as a cut fastball), knuckleball, curveball, and changeup. After the 1931 injury, his pitches included a fastball, slow curve, knuckleball and an even slower curveball used as a changeup.

Lyons made the most of his unusual scheduling, winning 52 of 82 decisions from 1939 until .

During 1942, Lyons's 20th and last full season, he led the league with a 2.10 ERA and completed every one of his 20 starts. Although exempt from the military draft due to age, after the season he enlisted in the United States Marine Corps and fought in the Pacific War. In 1943, the White Sox announced that Lyons's jersey number would not be reissued. In May of that year, he was based in Chicago at the Navy Pier. He commented that he would not be able to return to pitching if the war lasted three or four more years.

Lyons made a brief return to the mound in 1946, with a 2.32 ERA in five games, all complete. He stopped pitching for good that season, having compiled a 260–230 record, 356 complete games, 1073 strikeouts and a 3.67 ERA. Lyons never appeared in a postseason game, as the generally mediocre-to-poor White Sox were usually far behind the American League leaders during his career. In Lyons's 21 seasons with the Sox, they finished fifth or lower (in an eight-team league) 16 times, and never finished higher than third. New York Yankees manager Joe McCarthy said, "If (Lyons had) pitched for the Yankees, he would have won over 400 games."

Lyons was a better than average hitting pitcher in his 21-year major league career, posting a .233 batting average (364-for-1563) with 162 runs, 49 doubles, 9 triples, 5 home runs, 149 RBI and 73 bases on balls. He was used as a pinch hitter 45 times. Defensively, he recorded a .958 fielding percentage which was only a couple of points higher than the league average at his position.

Managing and coaching career
Lyons succeeded Dykes as the White Sox manager in May  after an apparent contract dispute between Dykes and Grace Comiskey. He had less success as a manager than he had as a player, guiding them to a meager 185–245 record. Lyons resigned as manager in October 1948.

Lyons coached the pitchers for the Detroit Tigers (1949–1952) and Brooklyn Dodgers.

Managerial record

Later life
In 1955, he was inducted into the Baseball Hall of Fame. Lyons served as a scout with the White Sox until his retirement in 1967. Lawrence Ritter and Donald Honig included Lyons in their book The 100 Greatest Baseball Players of All Time (1981).

On July 25, 1986, Lyons died in a nursing home in Sulphur, Louisiana. One year later, the White Sox retired his uniform number, #16. However, aside from the 21 players who wore it through 1986, it had not been reissued since Lyons retired for good in 1946, and it had long been understood that no White Sox would ever wear it again.

In 2013, the Bob Feller Act of Valor Award honored Lyons as one of 37 Baseball Hall of Fame members for his service in the United States Marine Corps during World War II.

See also

List of knuckleball pitchers
List of Major League Baseball career wins leaders
List of Major League Baseball annual ERA leaders
List of Major League Baseball annual wins leaders
List of Major League Baseball no-hitters
List of Major League Baseball player-managers
List of Major League Baseball players who spent their entire career with one franchise

References

Further reading
 Honig, Donald (1975) Baseball When the Grass Was Real: Baseball from the Twenties to the Forties Told by the Men Who Played It. New York: Coward, McGann & Geoghegan. pp. 108–125. .

External links 

1900 births
1986 deaths
Sportspeople from Lake Charles, Louisiana
National Baseball Hall of Fame inductees
Major League Baseball pitchers
Chicago White Sox players
Detroit Tigers coaches
American League All-Stars
American League ERA champions
American League wins champions
Brooklyn Dodgers coaches
Chicago White Sox managers
Chicago White Sox scouts
Baseball players from Louisiana
Baylor Bears baseball players
Baylor Bears men's basketball players
Major League Baseball pitching coaches
Major League Baseball players with retired numbers
Knuckleball pitchers
Minor league baseball managers
Major League Baseball player-managers
United States Marine Corps personnel of World War II
United States Marines
American men's basketball players